Kelvyn Brown (born 1 April 1991), better known by his stage name Kelvyn Boy is a Ghanaian Afrobeat singer  from Assin Fosu, Central region of Ghana. He got signed  to Burniton Music Group owned by Stonebwoy and due to some controversies, left the label in the year 2019. He is known for  popular songs like  ''Mea'', Loko, Yawa No Dey, and Momo.

Early life and career 
Kelvyn Boy was born in Assin Fosu, to Solomon Yeboah and Adwoa Safoa. He lost his mother at early age. He was still able to complete Osei Tutu High School in Kumasi.

Discography 
Single
Toffee ft Medikal(2017)
Na you ft Stonebwoy(2017)
 Mea(2019)
 Yawa no Dey feat M.anifest(2019)
 New Year(2020)
Momo feat Darko Vibes, Mugeez
Killa Killa(2020)
Mata (2020)

Ep/Album

T.I.M.E Ep (2019)

Black Star (2020)

References 

Living people
21st-century Ghanaian male singers
21st-century Ghanaian singers
1991 births
People from Greater Accra Region